Hlboké is a village and municipality in Senica District in the Trnava Region of western Slovakia.

History
In historical records the village was first mentioned in 1262. In 1843 the Štúr's Slovak language was codified in the village.

Geography
The municipality lies at an altitude of 247 metres and covers an area of 20.212 km². It has a population of about 905 people. The village is at 48 ° 39'30 "S 17 ° 24'25" W.

Famous people
Jozef Miloslav Hurban, Slovak politician
Svetozár Hurban-Vajanský, Slovak writer

Genealogical resources

The records for genealogical research are available at the state archive "Statny Archiv in Bratislava, Slovakia"
 Roman Catholic church records (births/marriages/deaths): 1692-1895 (parish B)
 Lutheran church records (births/marriages/deaths): 1733-1896 (parish A)

Gallery

See also
 List of municipalities and towns in Slovakia

References

External links

https://web.archive.org/web/20070624233352/http://www.hlboke.sk/
Surnames of living people in Hlboke

Villages and municipalities in Senica District